The British Rail Class 86 is a class of electric locomotives built during the 1960s. Introduction of the class enabled the replacement of many steam locomotives, which were finally withdrawn by British Rail in 1968.

Under the earlier BR classification system, the type was given the designation AL6 (meaning the sixth design of AC locomotive) and locomotives were numbered E3101–E3200. In 1968, this was changed to Class 86 when British Rail introduced the TOPS classification system.

The type has had a generally long and successful career, with some members of the class seeing main line service lives in the UK of up to 55 years. Most regular passenger duties of the class came to end on both the WCML and the GEML in the early-to-mid-2000s, after a career of up to 40 years. Some members of the class remained in use for charter work and for freight work with Freightliner until 2021. A number of the class were exported to Bulgaria and Hungary and remain in use. , three Class 86s remain preserved in usable condition in the UK; all are in private ownership.

Development and construction
The class was developed as a result of experience with the earlier prototype classes 81, 82, 83, 84 and 85; these had been produced by different manufacturers in the early days of the WCML electrification, as test-beds for locomotive development.

The AL6 featured design elements pioneered on the earlier classes, such as the general construction of the bodies and bogies, and control systems. However, some design features were unique, such as the squarer front ends (as opposed to the raked back noses of the earlier designs), the lack of a second pantograph and the cooling fans, which were redesigned to produce less noise than the earlier locos. A major departure from the designs of the earlier prototype locomotives came in the use of axle-hung, rather than frame mounted traction motors; this feature would later prove very problematic for the class.

The order for 100 locomotives was placed in 1963; it was split between two manufacturers, with the English Electric Vulcan Foundry in Newton-le-Willows building 60 locomotives and British Rail Doncaster Works producing 40.

British Rail service

The class was introduced officially into service in August 1965; the entire fleet was delivered within 24 months of that date. In 1969, E3173 was fitted experimentally with the large helical 'flexicoil' springs. Trials carried out under the direction of the British Rail Research Division proved successful and the modification was applied gradually in phases to the whole fleet.

Within a short time, a further batch was modified to the new specification and renumbered accordingly; 86040–86048 became 86253–86261.

In 1970, locomotive E3173 was also fitted experimentally with a streamlined nose cone made from fibreglass; this was to assist BR's research into aerodynamics and high-speed running for their new Advanced Passenger Train and High Speed Train, which were under development. The record was not publicised however, as BR did not want the event to overshadow their new trains.     

At the same time, three Class 86s were converted into  test-bed locomotives for development of the Class 87; they were numbered initially to 86201–86203, refitted with BP9 bogies but were renumbered quickly to a new 86/1 subclass; 86101–86103. These locomotives were capable of  running. The most obvious visual difference between the classes is that the Class 86 has a windscreen with three windows, whereas the Class 87 only has two; likewise, the Class 86 was fitted with headcode boxes (later plated over) while the Class 87 was built without them.

By the late-1970s, there was a need for more locomotives capable of operating at 100 mph. To achieve this, nineteen 86/0s were modified by the use of SAB resilient wheels, a new design of wheel in two sections separated by a rubber bearing, which allowed their top speed to be raised. The converted locos (86011–86029) were renumbered into the 86/3 series (86311–86329). As the SAB wheels were found to be insufficient for preventing track damage, in 1984 BR decided to refit all of their remaining 86/0 and 86/3 locos with flexicoil suspension, and by the mid-1980s all of the modified 86/0s and 86/3s were renumbered again as 86/4s, allowing a standardised fleet capable of 100 mph running.

Class 86s would operate inter-city passenger services to Norwich and boat trains to Harwich until 2005, when they were replaced fully by Class 90s. In addition, many of the freightliner trains to Felixstowe were also hauled as far as Ipswich by Class 86 locomotives working in multiple.

A later development saw Class 86/2 and 86/4 locomotives fitted with time-division multiplexing to enable them to operate push-pull passenger trains. The main benefit of this was the requirement for fewer locomotives; for example, a second locomotive would otherwise have to join at the other end of the train after arrival at terminal stations to lead the train's onward journey. 52 Driving Van Trailers were manufactured and introduced to the WCML in 1988 to enable push-pull trains; Driving Brake Standard Opens were transferred later from Scotland to the GEML to work with their Class 86/2s. The 86/4s were already fitted with an older multiple-working system and this was gradually phased out after TDM was fitted across the fleet.

Sectorisation of British Rail in the late 1980s, saw the fleet split up again; the 86/2s were dedicated to the InterCity sector for use on express passenger trains, whilst the majority of the 86/4 subclass were dedicated to freight and parcels traffic. These locomotives were reclassified as a new subclass 86/6. Eight Class 86/2 locomotives were also dedicated to freight work and were reclassified as Class 86/5, being renumbered into the range 86501–86508. However, the InterCity sector of BR decided that it wanted these locomotives back, so they were soon renumbered back to Class 86/2s. For a period of one year starting on 10 May 1992, six Class 86/6s were returned to Parcels use. These were renumbered back to class 86/4, as follows: 86405, 86411, 86414, 86415, 86428 and 86431. All six remained in Railfreight's Triple Grey livery.

The late 1980s also saw the introduction of many new liveries. The class had previously worn rail blue when built with cast lion-and-wheel emblems, but this was replaced by the standard BR Blue livery from 1967 with a cast-metal double arrow symbol. The first new livery was introduced by the InterCity sector in 1984 with the unveiling of an 'InterCity Executive' livery, with dark grey upper body, tan lower body separated by red and white stripes, with wrap around yellow cabsides and yellow cab roofs.

InterCity undertook a rebranding of InterCity Swallow livery in 1987 on InterCity 125s, Class 90s and Class 91s, which were in the final stages of construction. Class 86/4s were still used on a mixed traffic basis on InterCity express trains, parcels, Speedlink and Freightliner traffic, so a modernised version of InterCity livery was used, commonly known as 'Mainline' livery. The red and white stripes and tan bands covered the whole bodyside, and the roof was dark grey. The whole of the ends were painted yellow, although some were repainted dark grey around the front windows.
It wasn't until 1990 that the first Class 86 received InterCity Swallow livery, when a full sector ownership was established.

The Railfreight sector introduced its new two tone grey livery in 1987, initially without sub-sector logos due to shared operations on speedlink and Freightliner duties. Four Class 86s received Railfreight General logos from June 1988, but all Class 86/6 locomotives carried Railfreight Distribution livery beginning in January 1990. Finally, the parcels sector introduced a new red and grey livery with repaints from July 1990 to July 1991, which was replaced with Rail Express Systems livery applied between December 1991 to February 1995.

Former operators
In the mid-1990s, British Rail was privatised and the Class 86 fleet was divided among several operators. These are dealt with separately below.

Anglia Railways/'One'

Anglia Railways was one of three passenger franchises to inherit the class. A fleet of 15 locomotives were inherited, which were used to exclusively haul London Liverpool Street- express services. The locomotives were used in push-pull mode with Mk 2E and Mk 2F coaching stock and a DBSO, which removed the need for the locomotive to swap ends at the termini. Generally, the locomotive was at the south, or London, end of a formation, with the DBSO at the north, or country, end of the trainthis was to aid simple switchover of locomotives by their home at Norwich Crown Point depot.

In 1998, Anglia Railways introduced a new livery of turquoise, with a central white stripe. The first locomotive to be treated was no. 86223 Norwich Union, followed quickly by no. 86218 NHS 50. Over the next few years the whole fleet was treated as they received works overhauls at Springburn Works, Glasgow.

Over the years, several of the Anglia fleet were withdrawn following mishaps. For example, nos. 86220, 86221 and 86237, were withdrawn in 2002, 2003 and 2004 respectively, following transformer failures. Another machine, no. 86252, was written off in 2002 after catching fire near Colchester on 1 December 2001 whilst no. 86257 was withdrawn in 2003 due to its general bad condition. These locomotives were replaced by locomotives made redundant from Virgin CrossCountry (nos. 86234/242) or West Coast (nos. 86209/260) franchises. Another locomotive, no. 86227, was reinstated to traffic in 2002 after being stored for many years. It was repainted in a variation of Anglia's turquoise livery, with a large Union Flag painted on the side and named Golden Jubilee to commemorate Queen Elizabeth II's 50th anniversary of her reign.

The first major changes to the fleet occurred in late 2002, when Anglia started to hire Class 90 locomotives from Freightliner. This was because, at the time, the Class 86 fleet was suffering from reliability problems. In late 2003, Anglia swapped to using English Welsh & Scottish owned Class 90 locomotives, hiring up to five at any one time. Consequently, the use of the Class 86 fleet was decreased, which subsequently allowed reliability to improve.

In early 2004, two locomotives suffered from serious transformer failures. One locomotive, no. 86246, was subsequently repaired, but the other, no. 86237, was withdrawn and later scrapped. This prompted the suggestion that the Anglia Class 86 fleet be replaced by the 15 Class 90 locomotives from Virgin Trains, which were soon to be made redundant by the introduction of new Class 390 Pendolino units.

On 1 April 2004, the Anglia Railways franchise ended and the franchise was merged with the other operators in East Anglia to form the new Greater Anglia franchise operated by One. With this came the news that the Class 86 fleet would progressively be replaced by Class 90 locomotives, cascaded from Virgin Trains. The first day of the new franchise saw two Class 90 locomotives unveiled in the new franchisee's 'One' livery. However, despite this announcement, one Class 86 locomotive, no. 86235, was authorised a complete overhaul. As such, this locomotive became the last to receive classified repairs.

For the first few months of the new franchise, all of the Class 86 fleet was retained, to insure against reliability issues with the new Class 90 locomotives. However, in October 2004, the fleet was reduced to just six examples, these being nos. 86218/232/234/235/246/260. The rest were withdrawn but three (nos. 86217/223/250) were subsequently sold to Fragonset Railways. By December, the fleet stood at just two operational locomotives, these being nos. 86235 Crown Point and 86246 Royal Anglian Regiment. These were the last two locomotives to receive classified repairs and consequently were the most reliable, in theory at least.

It was originally planned to withdraw these final two locomotives on 31 December 2004. However, all did not go to plan, as the replacement Class 90 locomotives did not prove to be as reliable as hoped. Therefore, two locomotives were reprieved until at least March 2005. A final twist saw no. 86232 repaired, replacing no. 86246, which had again suffered from a serious failure. A third locomotive, no. 86234, was also repaired and briefly returned to traffic in April 2005, but was later stored again after failing. The last two locomotives (nos. 86232/235) saw occasional use when insufficient Class 90 locomotives were available. By mid-2005,  no. 86232 was out of use and no. 86235 was operational but not used. The final use of the class came on 17 September 2005, when no. 86235 was used on several Norwich-London return trips to mark its retirement from service. This brought an end to 40 years of Class 86-hauled passenger trains.

Colas Rail
86701 joined the Colas Rail fleet and was painted into the Colas Rail yellow and orange livery in October 2012. This, however, was short lived, as it was withdrawn from mainline use in January 2013. In 2015, it was used for contractual work at Ilford depot. In March 2016, it was transferred to Europhoenix, where it was subsequently exported to Bulgaria for further use.

Caledonian Sleeper
On 31 March 2015, the new Caledonian Sleeper contract started, following takeover of the contract from DB Schenker. In February 2015, 86101 was repainted into the new Caledonian Blue livery. From 31 March 2015, 86101 was used to convey the empty sleeper coaching stock between London Euston and Wembley Intercity Depot, as well as between Glasgow Central and Polmadie TRSMD, along with 87002. After a lengthy refurbishment, 86401 joined the Caledonian Sleeper fleet on 8 August 2015. In October 2019, the Class 86s were withdrawn, primarily due to coupler incompatibility, and returned to the AC Locomotive Group.

English, Welsh & Scottish Railway

English Welsh & Scottish inherited a small fleet of 15 locomotives when it bought the Rail Express Systems parcels business. One of the locomotives, no. 86239 LS Lowry, was destroyed in an accident at Stafford in 1996.

EWS soon diversified the use of its fleet, hiring its locomotives to charter train operators and also to Virgin Trains, to supplement their unreliable fleet. Three locomotives (nos. 86261/401/426) were repainted into EWS's red and gold livery.

The rundown of the fleet started in 2001, when the locomotives were replaced on charter and mail trains by Class 67 or Class 90 locomotives. They saw continued use with Virgin Trains, however, but were gradually withdrawn as new Class 390 Pendolino units entered service, reducing the need for hired locomotives. By the end of their working careers, most of the EWS locomotives were in an appalling state and suffered from numerous failures. The final locomotives, nos. 86210/401/424 were withdrawn from traffic in late 2002.

Following withdrawal from traffic, two locomotives (nos. 86426/430) were subsequently reinstated and hired to Freightliner, on a long-term contract. This was due to a Class 90 locomotive, no. 90150, being written off due to fire damage, resulting in a shortage of electric traction. The two locomotives were repainted into Freightliner's racing green livery and employed on intermodal traffic, with the rest of Freightliner's Class 86 fleet. The contract ended in mid-2004, following deliveries of new Class 66 locomotives, meaning that the two electric locomotives were surplus to requirements and they were withdrawn from traffic.

In late 2003, with the exception of the two locomotives on hire to Freightliner, EWS advertised all of its remaining locomotives for sale. Most were subsequently sold for scrap, but one locomotive (no. 86401) was preserved (later hired in and used by GB Railfreight on the Caledonian Sleeper contract), whilst two others (nos. 86210/424) were sold for further use with Network Rail and reclassified class 86/9. The former Freightliner pair were sold to C F Booth in late 2005.

FM Rail
FM Rail (previously Fragonset Railways) briefly leased several locomotives from HSBC Rail. These locomotives were previously used by Anglia Railways (86217/223/250), Virgin Cross-Country (86231/251) and Virgin West Coast (86229/233). One locomotive, ex-Virgin 86212, was hauled to East Ham Depot in London to be used for carriage power duties for the new Blue Pullman train. However, it did not operate services on the mainline.

FM Rail entered administration in December 2006, without having returned any of their Class 86 locomotives to traffic and they were returned to the lease company.

Freightliner

Freightliner inherited a large fleet of thirty Class 86/6 freight-dedicated locomotives, most of which had previously been operated by Railfreight Distribution, but some came from Rail Express Systems. The fleet therefore consisted of locomotives in many different obsolete liveries so, from 1995, Freightliner started to apply its newly introduced livery. This was based on the previous Trainload two-tone grey, with the addition of Freightliner red triangle logo.

The Freightliner fleet were originally employed on intermodal traffic along the northern half of the WCML from Crewe to Coatbridge (near Glasgow). The steep gradients along this route meant that trains were hauled by pairs of locomotives working in multiple. The class also worked services south from Crewe to Tilbury and Ipswich (for onwards movement to Felixstowe by diesel locomotive), and some services to Trafford Park in Manchester. The class have occasionally been used on the East Coast Main Line, particularly when services are diverted due to engineering works.

In 1998, following the introduction of the rebuilt Class 57 diesel locomotives, Freightliner introduced a new livery of racing green with yellow cabsides. The first Class 86 to appear in this livery was no. 86631, which was hurriedly repainted for display at an open day at Toton. The majority of the fleet have slowly been treated over the years, such that by the end of 2004, only a handful remained in the original two-tone grey livery.

In 2000, locomotive no. 86608 was experimentally regeared to allow it to work trains single-handedly. It was reclassified as Class 86/5 and renumbered to 86501. This was the second time this classification and number had been used. The first occasion being former 86/2s dedicated to freight work in the late 1980s (86258 having previously held the 86501 number). Despite the apparent success of 86501's conversion, no further locomotives have been similar regeared. In mid-2004, the locomotive suffered fire damage, but was subsequently repaired and returned to service. 86501 again suffered fire damage in August 2008 near Bletchley. It was subsequently repaired in December 2008 and returned to service again shortly after.

Due to a locomotive shortage in 2002, two further locomotives, nos. 86426/430, were hired from English Welsh & Scottish, which had just withdrawn its last examples. Since the hire contract was long-term, both locomotives were repainted in Freightliner green livery. They were used in a common pool with the rest of the fleet. By 2004, the need for the extra locomotives was reduced, so both were returned to EWS and subsequently withdrawn.

Two other locomotives, nos. 86101/102, formerly used by Virgin Trains, were also briefly hired by Freightliner in 2001/2002. Neither of these locomotives were repainted and they both retained obsolete InterCity livery. Due to their non-standard nature, both locomotives had been withdrawn by early 2002.

Following the withdrawal of the Anglia Railways, Virgin Trains and EWS fleets, Freightliner became the last operator of the class. In January 2005, it had an operational fleet of twenty-two locomotives, with several more in warm-storage (capable of being returned to traffic). In the last few years, however, several locomotives have been withdrawn from service, mainly due to the influx of new Class 66 diesel locomotives; in addition, two locomotives (nos. 86611/631) were written off following the Norton Bridge rail crash and another three (nos. 86615/620/621) have been withdrawn following fire damage and subsequently scrapped. In addition, Freightliner's Class 90 fleet, which were previously hired to passenger operators Virgin Trains and Anglia Railways, have now all returned to the company, thus reducing the requirement for the Class 86 fleet. However, Freightliner retained a core fleet of sixteen locomotives, with two locomotives (nos. 86622/637) repainted into Freightliner Powerhaul livery.

By early 2021, the fleet was down to just two locomotives, and these final two were withdrawn from service in March, replaced by ex-Greater Anglia Class 90s.

Hull Trains

The open-access passenger operator Hull Trains obtained the use of 86101 (one of the preserved Class 86 locomotives), between January and April 2008, to provide cover in the short term for its badly damaged Class 222 Pioneer DMU. The locomotive, together with a rake of Mark 3 coaches, was introduced to public services between London and Doncaster on 11 January 2008, following several months of tests and training, and ran until 20 April 2008 when Class 180 Adelante DMUs were introduced to the service.

Vintage Trains
In 2008, privately owned and preserved 86259 was returned to service on the main line, regaining the name of its owner Les Ross. It was operated on occasional charters by Vintage Trains from their base at Tyseley and, from 2011, was based at Willesden and available for ad-hoc charters. By August 2011, it had covered 5.7 million miles in service.

86259 is no longer connected to Vintage Trains.

Virgin Trains
The Virgin Trains group was formed of two franchises: CrossCountry and InterCity West Coast.

CrossCountry
The CrossCountry franchise inherited a fleet of 19 locomotives. Other services continued south to Birmingham International, whilst others originated from Preston.

From 1998 onwards, locomotives began to be outshopped in the new Virgin Trains red and black livery. However, a few locomotives retained the old InterCity livery.

In mid-2001, Virgin CrossCountry started to introduce new Class 220 Voyager and Class 221 Super-Voyager units. These new trains enabled Virgin to start to retire its older traction. Several of the early withdrawals were transferred to other operators, such as nos. 86234 and 86242 to Anglia Railways. However, the majority of locomotives were retained in service until September 2002, when virtually the entire fleet was withdrawn en masse. Prior to this, Virgin had specially repainted no. 86253 in InterCity livery to commemorate its final few months in traffic. The final Cross-Country operated service was actually operated by no. 86233, from the West-Coast fleet, which had been repainted in original electric blue livery a few weeks earlier.

Since withdrawal from traffic, several locomotives have been scrapped at Immingham Railfreight Terminal. A few locomotives were sold to other operators for further use, such as no. 86253 to Network Rail and nos. 86231/251 to Fragonset Railways. One locomotive, no. 86249, was retained by Virgin until late-2004, as a driver-training locomotive at Polmadie depot in Glasgow.

West Coast

By 2001, the fleet had been cut to nine locomotives, with 86209 being transferred to Anglia Railways and three more (nos. 86101/102/213) withdrawn from traffic.

In 1998, no. 86229 became the first of the class to be repainted in Virgin's red and black livery. By 2001, all except one locomotive had been repainted in this livery.

The West Coast fleet contained several 'celebrity' locomotives, including no. 86245 Caledonian, which was repainted into a variant of the Virgin livery using Caledonian Railway blue in place of the standard red, to celebrate the company's 150th Anniversary. In 2002, no. 86233 was specially repainted into original electric blue to commemorate the last few months in traffic for the fleet. One locomotive, no. 86228, also retained in the old InterCity livery.

In mid-2003, the rundown of the fleet started as new Class 390 Pendolino electrical multiple units entered service. The final three locomotives (nos. 86229/233/247) were removed from traffic in September 2003. The final service being operated by electric blue locomotive no. 86233. Several of the fleet were later transferred to other operators, including Anglia Railways (no. 86260) and Fragonset Railways (nos. 86212/229/233). One former West Coast locomotive (no. 86259) has been preserved.

Network Rail
In 2004, Network Rail acquired three locomotives (nos. 86210/253/424), of which the first two were converted to mobile load-bank testing locomotives, with the third used for spares. The two operational locomotives were reclassified as Class 86/9 and renumbered as 86901/902. They were formerly  based at Rugby, but were moved and stored at Derby and carried the Network Rail all-over yellow livery. Their primary use was to test the overhead line supply of electrified lines by simulating various loads. Both locomotives were capable of running under their own power for positioning purposes, but could not haul any significant loads. Therefore, when being used to test the overhead supply, they had to be hauled by a diesel locomotive.

As of 8 January 2014, they were removed from service and extracted from Derby by low-loader and taken to Long Marston. 86901 was subsequently taken to Sandbach Car and Commercial Dismantlers, where it was broken up, whilst 86902 suffered the same fate at CF Booth's scrapyard in Rotherham. 86424, the erstwhile source of spares, was exported to Hungary, where it is used as a source of spares for the Class 86s that were purchased by Floyd Zrt for freight usage. 86424 was returned to service with Floyd in late 2018, due to Floyd's need for an additional Class 86.

Current operators

Bulgaria export

The first Class 86 to be exported to Bulgaria was 86233 in October 2012. It served as a spares donor for Bulmarket previously exported Class 87s, numbers 87009, 87017, 87023 and 87025. In March 2016, Bulmarket purchased an additional six Class 86 locomotives with the intent of operating them alongside their Class 87 locos. By the end of 2017 they had a fully operational fleet of six locos, renumbered into the 85xxx range:

85001 (ex-86701), 85002 (ex-86702), 85003 (ex-86213), 85004 (ex-86235), 85005 (ex-86231) and 85006 (ex-86234)

Hungary export

In 2008, Europhoenix completed a deal to purchase the remaining Class 86/2 fleet from HSBC Rail Leasing, numbering 23 locomotives, with the intention of overhauling some of them for use in Europe and the UK. 86248 and 86250 were sold to Hungarian private open access freight operator Floyd Zrt and were delivered in February and May 2009, becoming Hungarian Class 450. As of 2020, Floyd Zrt owns nine Class 86 locomotives.

Locomotive Services
Following their replacement on the Caledonian Sleeper trains, one of the two class 86s owned by AC Locomotive Group, 86101 Sir William A Stanier FRS, was sold to Locomotive Services Limited in November 2019 along with Class 87 no. 87002. 86101 was then repainted from its Caledonian blue livery into InterCity Swallow livery, as were 87002, 90001 and 90002.

West Coast Railways

Privately owned class 86, no. 86259, was transferred over from operating with Vintage Trains in around 2012 and is presently used by West Coast Railways hauling excursion trains from London. These have, so far, included the popular Cumbrian Mountain Express excursion trains and, in recent times, its first-ever visit to Blackpool along the newly electrified line to Blackpool North while working the Pennine Blackpool Express.

In February 2020, West Coast Railway acquired its first Class 86, no. 86401 Mons Meg, which had previously been owned by AC Locomotive Group and used on the Caledonian Sleeper services from London to Scotland. Following the replacement of the sleeper's Mark 2 and Mark 3 coaches with new Mark 5 coaches, 86401 was taken off lease.

Preservation

Currently three locomotives have been preserved, with examples from both manufacturers:

 The first locomotive to be preserved was 86401, which was named Hertfordshire Rail Tours at the time. This locomotive was operated by EWS until 2002, when it was one of their three final machines to be withdrawn from traffic. Prior to that, it was the only locomotive of its class to be painted in Network SouthEast livery and was named Northampton Town. In this guise, it was used on London Liverpool Street-Cambridge and London Euston-Northampton passenger trains. In 2004, 86401 was preserved by the AC Locomotive Group, which also owns examples of Classes 81-85, based at Barrow Hill Engine Shed. 86401 was deployed initially in the reserve fleet of operational shunting/depot service locomotives at Willesden TMD. In February 2015, 86401 moved to Leicester depot, where it underwent renovation work; modifications included the fitting of GSM-R and OTMR, the recommissioning of the time-division multiplexing system and attention to the components and bodywork. On 12 May 2015, it was moved to Brush Traction where it was repainted into Caledonian Blue livery and renamed Mons Meg; it was used subsequently on Serco's Caledonian Sleeper contract. The locomotive was purchased by West Coast Railways in February 2020 and is now based at Carnforth MPD; it hauled a small number of railtours in 2022. 

 86101 was preserved by the AC Locomotive Group in August 2005. It was stored initially at MoD Ashchurch, but was restored to working condition at Barrow Hill. On 15 March 2007,  it undertook its first test run; it then hauled the Carlisle-Crewe and return legs of The Ynys Mon Express railtour to Holyhead on 24 March 2007. In December 2014, after a few years in storage, 86101 made its initial main-line run to and from Willesden TMD. In 2015, 86101 was selected as one of the locomotives to support the new Caledonian Sleeper Services. In February 2015, it was taken to Brush Traction where it was painted into Caledonian Blue livery. From March 2015 to September 2019, it was used to convey empty coaching stock for the Caledonian sleepers between London Euston and Wembley InterCity depot, as well as between Glasgow Central and Polmadie TRSMD, alongside 87002. 86101 was sold subsequently to Locomotive Services Limited in November 2019, along with 87002, and was painted into InterCity Swallow livery; it currently hauls excursions. 

 86259 has been preserved, initially at Tyseley Locomotive Works and, as of late 2017, stabled at Rugby station. It is owned by Les Ross, after whom the locomotive was named. The locomotive is maintained in full operational condition, wearing its initial Electric Blue scheme. The engine also wears different nameplates; on one side, it carries the nameplate Les Ross and, on the other, it has the nameplate Peter Pan. It also has its original number E3137 at one end and 86259 at the other. It hauls the Cumbrian Mountain Express excursions several times each year, in conjunction with Railway Touring Company. 

A further locomotive, 86213, was preserved initially by the AC Locomotive Group, but has since been sold to Bulmarket and exported to Bulgaria.

Three cab sections have been saved from scrapped locomotives. Two cabs from 86247 were saved by the South Wales Cab Preservation Group and one cab from 86902 was saved by a private owner. One cab from 86247 has since been sold to a private owner and is on display at Crewe Heritage Centre.

Fleet details

N.B. All locomotives numbered 86253–86261, 863xx, 864xx and 866xx were previously numbered in the 860xx series.

Accidents
Over the years, several Class 86 locomotives have been involved in accidents. The most serious of these was the Watford Junction rail crash on 23 January 1975, between Bushey and Watford Junction, when no. 86209 collided head-on with Class 83 no. 83003. The Class 86 was seriously damaged after falling down an embankment, coming to rest in a field (now the site of the Colne Valley Retail Park). It was eventually recovered, several weeks later, by road. Surprisingly, given the seriousness of the incident, it was authorised for repairs and later returned to service.

Also, on 6 June 1975, nos. 86006 and 86242 were involved in the Nuneaton rail crash. The accident happened when the 23:30 sleeper from London Euston to Glasgow derailed after entering a temporary speed restriction at too high a speed, resulting in the loss of six lives. Both locomotives were later repaired. 

Another serious accident was the Colwich rail crash on 19 September 1986, when nos. 86211 and 86429 were involved in a head-on collision. Both locomotives were written off and subsequently scrapped at Crewe Works over the following year.

On 8 March 1996, a Travelling Post Office train hauled by no. 86239 collided with the rear of a freight train at Stafford, writing-off the locomotive and killing two of the Royal Mail employees on board the train, John Thomson and Tommy Poynts.

On 16 October 2003, the Norton Bridge rail crash saw an intermodal train, hauled by nos. 86631 and 86611, collide with the rear of another stationary freight train. The force of the impact broke the leading locomotive in half, although the driver survived. 86631 was written off due to severe damage, while 86611 became a source of spares for Freightliner.

Model railways
In 1981, Hornby Railways launched its first version of the Class 86 in OO gauge in BR Blue, as 86219 Phoenix. Further examples, in a variety of liveries, have since been released, although the Hornby model has since been superseded by a model from Heljan; however, this latter model had its faults and a retooled version depicting Classes 86/4 and 86/6 was announced in 2019. Further Class 86/2 models 
will then join the Heljan range in 2023.

In N gauge, a model was made briefly by Lima as E3185 in Electric Blue livery; however, this model was too short and has not been available new for many years. A more accurate model is made by Dapol and is available in a variety of liveries.

Notes

References

Sources

Further reading

External links
 
 The AC Locomotive Group
 BR Blue Livery Specification

Bo-Bo locomotives
86
English Electric locomotives
Vulcan Foundry locomotives
25 kV AC locomotives
Railway locomotives introduced in 1965
Standard gauge locomotives of Great Britain
Standard gauge locomotives of Bulgaria
Standard gauge locomotives of Hungary
Electric locomotives of Hungary